Schweigaard's Ministerium, often referred to as the April Ministerium, was an interlude lasting from 3 April to 26 June 1884, following the impeachment of the Selmer cabinet, and prior to Sverdrup's Liberal cabinet.

Cabinet

|}

Schweigaard
1884 establishments in Norway
1884 disestablishments in Norway